Balmy Beach may refer to:
Balmy Beach, an unincorporated community in the Township Georgian Bluffs, Ontario, Canada
Balmy Beach, a former unincorporated community in Ontario, Canada, annexed by Toronto in 1909
Balmy Beach, a beach on Lake Ontario in The Beaches neighbourhood of Toronto, Canada
Toronto Balmy Beach Beachers, a former Ontario Rugby Football Union team in Toronto, Canada